Daniel James Bandit (born Daniel Rogers James; August 14, 1980), better known as Ghostshrimp, is an American graphic artist, animator and illustrator. His illustration work has appeared in The New York Times, The New Yorker, and on many album covers, including the MF DOOM and Bishop Nehru collaboration NehruvianDoom. He is the former lead background designer for the Cartoon Network series Adventure Time. He left midway through production of the fourth season to return to his freelance career, although he later temporarily returned to design backgrounds for the seventh season miniseries Stakes and several subsequent ninth and tenth-season episodes. Finally, for the same channel he created in 2013 the pilot Mars Safari!, which was released online as part of Cartoon Network Studios' shorts development program.

History

Ghostshrimp lived a self-proclaimed "Mark Twain childhood", and he spent most of his time in the forests around his home in rural western Massachusetts. When his family eventually moved to seacoast New Hampshire, the memories of the forests that he played in as a kid stayed with him and became hugely influential when he became an artist. Prior to moving to California, Ghostshrimp graduated from the Pratt Institute, where he had studied art. After that, lived in a cabin that he had constructed himself on Mystery Mountain in New Hampshire. This influenced his later ideas for the Land of Ooo, as in how he envisioned Finn and Jake's tree fort.

In 2008, Ghostshrimp freelanced for Cartoon Network, working with John Infantino to storyboard three episodes for the first season of Thurop Van Orman's series The Marvelous Misadventures of Flapjack. He eventually moved out to California to work full-time on the show's second season, but after completing only one episode was fired by Van Orman from the series due to disagreements with his storyboard partner, Mike Roth.

Around this time, Adventure Time was in development and its producers had been long fretting about the series' background art. Creator Pendleton Ward wanted his series to be "fully realized", with a greater emphasis on the series' environment and setting. The crew had tried a whole variety of art styles for the background art, but nothing seemed to gel with Ward's vision. Eventually, after considering Ghostshrimp's designs, the crew believed that they had found their designer; in fact, former creative director Patrick McHale noted that he "was pretty much perfect". Ward and McHale approached Ghostshrimp the day after he was let go from Flapjack and offered him a job on the show. Ghostshrimp was given free rein to design the world, and Ward told the artist to make the series look like it took "place in a 'Ghostshrimp World'".

Ghostshrimp had taken the job at Cartoon Network in order to save up enough money to buy a tract of land in Northern New England to build the Bandit family homestead and start a training camp for aspiring visual artists. His plan eventually worked, and he left Adventure Time during production of the show's fourth season and moved into the forest of the Northeast Kingdom of Vermont. The inaugural session of Ghostscout Training Camp lasted from August 1 to September 1, 2012, and Ghostshrimp continues to host the 30-day training camp every August.

Ghostshrimp has returned to Adventure Time several times. The first was in March 2015, when he agreed to design backgrounds for the seventh-season miniseries "Stakes". According to his official Facebook profile, he designed around 70 new pieces for the show. In later 2016 and early 2017, Ghostshrimp also revealed that he was working on new background pieces for several ninth- and tenth-season episodes, including several that comprise the show's finale.

Art style
Ghostshrimp's art style is highly idiosyncratic. Fellow background artist Chris Tsirgiotis has described Ghostshrimp's art as "simple at first glance, but it’s actually very sophisticated and nuanced". Tsirgiotis has also said that Ghostshrimp "is a master at his use of pattern. He puts it in just about everything he does."

Filmography

Further reading

References

Footnotes

Bibliography

External links
 Official website
 

Adventure Time
1980 births
Pratt Institute alumni
American illustrators
American animators
Living people